The 2009 Pavel Roman Memorial was the 15th edition of an annual international ice dancing competition held in Olomouc, Czech Republic. The event was held on November 20–22, 2009. Ice dancers competed in the senior, junior, and novice levels.

Results

Senior

External links
 results

Pavel Roman Memorial, 2009
Pavel Roman Memorial